Salvador José Mañer (1676–1751) was a Spanish journalist, historian and writer.

Selected works
A Critical History of the Passion of Jesus Christ
The political system of Europe
The Swiss referee, 
History of Prince Eugene of Savoy, 
Count Teckeli historical novel, 
The famous marine man 
The critical Amphitheater
Triumph of the Christian religion, and true Roman Church.
New Explanation of many places of sacred Scripture, which claims to be well illustrated by the lack of natural light and natural sciences.
History of the Rulers of the world.
Collection of the Golden Bull, with notes, Madrid, 1745.

Spanish male writers
18th-century Spanish historians
People from Cádiz
1676 births
1751 deaths
18th-century Spanish journalists